Beacon Pines is a 2022 narrative adventure indie video game developed by Hiding Spot Games, and published by Fellow Traveller. The game was released on September 22, 2022 for Microsoft Windows, Nintendo Switch and the Xbox One (via Game Pass).

Narrated by Kirsten Mize and set in the titular town, the storybook-based exploration game follows Luka uncovering the mysterious secrets of his hometown alongside his friends Rolo and Beck.

Plot 
Luka VanHorn is a 12-year-old deer boy who lives in Beacon Pines with his grandmother after his father passed away when he was six, and his mother mysteriously disappeared. He hangs out with his best friend Rolo Cotter, a liger. While awaiting the town's upcoming Harvest Festival, the pair stumble onto some strange happenings at the abandoned warehouse in the woods near their treehouse. Along with the new girl in town, Beck Moedwil, the trio seeks to unravel the mysteries of what exactly is going on in their town.

Reception 

Beacon Pines received "generally favorable" reviews, according to review aggregator Metacritic.

References

External links 

2022 video games
Adventure games
Cats in popular culture
Crowdfunded video games
Exploration video games
Indie video games
Kickstarter-funded video games
LGBT-related video games
Mystery adventure games
Nintendo Switch games
Single-player video games
Video games about animals
Video games about children
Video games developed in the United States
Video games set in forests
Video games with alternate endings
Visual novels
Windows games
Xbox One games
Fellow Traveller games